The following is a list of squads for each nation competing at the 2018 Super 6 baseball tournament.

Manager  Sven Hendrickx

Manager  Mike Griffin

Manager  Martin Helmig

Manager  Gilberto Gerali

Manager  Evert-Jan 't Hoen

Manager  Paco Figueroa

External links
Official site

Super 6 Baseball and Softball